Dunnsville may refer to:

 Dunnsville, Virginia
 Dunnsville, Western Australia